Sonja Frey (born 22 April 1993) is an Austrian handballer who plays as a centre back for Thüringer HC and the Austria women's national handball team.

Achievements
Bundesliga: 
Winner: 2013, 2014, 2015
DHB Pokal: 
Winner: 2013
Danish Championship:
Winner: 2020
European Junior Championship: 
Bronze Medalist: 2011

Individual awards 
 Most Valuable Player of the European Junior Championship: 2011

See also
Handball

References

1993 births
Living people
Handball players from Vienna
Austrian female handball players
Expatriate handball players
Austrian expatriate sportspeople in Germany
Austrian expatriate sportspeople in France
Austrian expatriate sportspeople in Denmark